Max Landis (born February 2, 1993) is an American basketball player who plays for FC Porto in the Portuguese Basketball League.

College career
Landis attended Gardner-Webb for his first two years of college eligibility, then transferred to Indiana University – Purdue University Fort Wayne (IPFW) for his final two seasons. As a senior in the 2015–16 season, Landis was named the Summit League Player of the Year.

Professional career
After a successful senior campaign, Landis conducted workouts with the Chicago Bulls, Milwaukee Bucks, Utah Jazz, and his hometown team Indiana Pacers.
On June 15, 2016, Landis signed with Crelan Okapi Aalstar of the Belgian Basketball League.

Following the 2016–17 campaign, Landis signed with the Gießen 46ers of the German Basketball Bundesliga.

References

1993 births
Living people
American expatriate basketball people in Belgium
American expatriate basketball people in Germany
American men's basketball players
Basketball players from Indianapolis
FC Porto basketball players
Gardner–Webb Runnin' Bulldogs men's basketball players
Giessen 46ers players
Okapi Aalstar players
Point guards
Purdue Fort Wayne Mastodons men's basketball players